The Congregation of Christian Brothers (abbreviated CFC) is a worldwide religious community within the Catholic Church, founded by Blessed Edmund Rice. 

Their first school was opened in Waterford, Ireland, in 1802. At the time of its foundation, though much relieved from the harshest of the Penal Laws by the Parliament's Relief Acts, UK Catholics faced much discrimination throughout the newly created United Kingdom of Great Britain and Ireland pending full Catholic emancipation in 1829.

This congregation is sometimes referred to as simply "the Christian Brothers", leading to confusion with the De La Salle Brothers—also known as the Christian Brothers (sometimes by Lasallian organisations themselves). As such, Rice's congregation is sometimes called the Irish Christian Brothers or the Edmund Rice Christian Brothers.

History

Formation of The Christian brothers

At the turn of the nineteenth century, Waterford merchant Edmund Rice considered travelling to Rome to join a religious institute, possibly the Augustinians. Instead, with the support of Thomas Hussey, Bishop of Waterford and Lismore, he decided to found a religious community dedicated to teaching disadvantaged youth.

The first school, on Waterford's New Street, was a converted stable and opened in 1802, with a second school opening in Stephen Street soon after to cater for increasing enrollment. Two men from his hometown of Callan, Thomas Grosvenor and Patrick Finn, soon arrived to aid Rice in his makeshift schools, with the intention of living the life of lay brothers. In the same year, Rice used proceeds from the sale of his victualling business to begin building a community house and school on land provided by the diocese. Bishop Hussey opened the new complex, christened “Mount Sion” on June 7, 1803, and pupils were transferred to the new school building the following year. The reputation of the school spread and across the next few years several men sought to become “Michaels”.

On 15 August 1808 seven men, including Edmund Rice, took religious promises under Bishop John Power of Waterford. Following the example of Nano Nagle's Presentation Sisters, they were called "Presentation Brothers".  This was one of the first congregations of men to be founded in Ireland and one of the few founded in the Church by a layman.

Houses were soon opened in Carrick-on-Suir, Dungarvan, and in 1811, in Cork. In 1812 the Archbishop of Dublin established a community in the nation's capital and by 1907 there were ten communities in Dublin, with pupils in excess of 6,000. The schools included primary, secondary and technical schools, along with orphanages and a school for the deaf. A community was founded in Limerick in 1816, followed by establishments in several of Ireland's principal towns.

The Holy See formally established the congregation in 1820. This, too, was an unusual event, since the Christian Brothers were the first Irish congregation of men approved by a charter from Rome.

Some brothers in Cork chose to remain under the original Presentation rule and continued to be known as Presentation Brothers, a separate congregation but also recognising Edmund Rice as its Founder.

Expansion

The  congregation of Irish Christian Brothers spread to Liverpool and other parts of England. These new ventures were not always immediately successful. Two brothers had been sent to Gibraltar to establish an institute in 1835. However, despite initial successes they left in August 1837 on account of disagreements with the local priests. In 1878 the Brothers returned  to the then Crown colony of Gibraltar. The school eventually flourished supplying education to the twentieth century. The "Line Wall College" was noted in 1930 for the education that it supplied to "well to do" children.

Similarly, a mission to Sydney, Australia, in 1842 failed within a couple of years. Brother Ambrose Treacy established a presence in Melbourne, Australia in 1868, in 1875 in Brisbane, Australia and, in 1876, a school was commenced in Dunedin, New Zealand. In 1875 a school was opened in St. John’s, Newfoundland.  In 1886 the Pope requested that they consider setting up in India, and a province of the congregation was established there.

In 1900, there came the invitation to establish houses in Rome, and in 1906 schools were established in New York City. In 1940 Iona College was founded in New York, as a Higher Education College, facilitating poorer high school graduates to progress to a college education.

St. Joseph's Junior Novitiate, Baldoyle was where trainee brothers went to complete their second level studies, normally proceeding to St. Mary's in Marino to train as school teachers. To-day there is a nursing home there, and there are over 1000 brothers buried in the cemetery in St. Patrick's, Baldoyle.

In 1925 the brothers bought St. Helen's, Booterstown which became their administrative headquarters and novitiate. Around 1968, land to the South was used to build two new schools Coláiste Eoin and Coláiste Íosagáin. St. Helen's was sold in 1988.

In 1955 Stella Maris College in Uruguay was established. In 1972 the alumnus rugby team was travelling in Uruguayan Air Force Flight 571 when it crashed in the Andes, stranding survivors in freezing conditions with little food and no heat for 72 days; 16 of the 45 people on the aircraft survived.

In the 1950s, due to the number of brothers in Ireland, it was split into two sections divided into North and South by a line from Dublin to Galway.

In 1967 the Christian Brothers had a membership of about 5,000, teaching in around 600 schools.

The Christian Brothers teacher training centre at St. Mary's/Colaiste Mhuire, has become the Marino Institute for Education which has trained lay teachers since 1972 and has offered degrees validated by the University of Dublin since 1974. In 2012 Trinity College Dublin became a co-trustee with the Brothers of the Institute.

The Brothers' schools include primary, secondary and technical schools, orphanages and schools for the deaf. A number of these technical schools originally taught poor children trades, such as carpentry and building skills, after which they could progress to gain apprenticeships and employment. As the National School system and vocational schools developed in the Irish Republic, the Irish Christian Brothers became more concentrated on secondary education.

Contraction
As of 2018, there were 872 Christian Brothers and 172 houses.

In 2008 it was reported that not more than ten Christian Brothers were teaching in Irish schools, with the expectation that there would soon be none. This was contrasted with the mid-1960s, when over 1,000 Brothers worked in schools, with no shortage of new recruits.

Organizational structure of the Christian Brothers

Geographically, the Christian Brothers are divided into several provinces that encompass every inhabited continent. The brothers within each province work under the direction of a Province Leadership Team. In turn, the entire Congregation operates under the leadership of a Congregation Leadership Team that is based in Rome (and led by the Congregation Leader). These provincial and congregational teams are elected on a six-year basis at Congregation chapters.

Restructuring has taken place in the congregation to account for the changing needs, in particular the declining number of brothers in the developed world. The three provinces of North America (Canada, Eastern American, and Western American Province) restructured into the Edmund Rice Christian Brothers North America on 1 July 2005.  The provinces that cover Ireland, Great Britain and the Congregational Leadership Team in Rome combined into a single European province on May 5, 2007, while the five provinces covering Australia, New Zealand and Papua New Guinea combined into one Oceania province on October 1, 2007,  The English Province is a registered charity. The Dublin Headquarters are in the grounds of Marino Institute of Education, Claremont, Griffith Avenue, Dublin 9, Ireland.

A special community within this new European province will be based in Geneva, Switzerland, working to establish an NGO known as Edmund Rice International. The purpose of such an organisation is to gain what is known as a "general consultative status" with the United Nations. "This position allows groups the opportunity to challenge systemic injustice and to engage in advocacy work with policymakers on behalf of people who are made poor." As well as including Christian Brothers from provinces all over the world, members of the Presentation Brothers will also have a presence within this community.

Edmund Rice Development is a faith-based non-governmental organisation with charity status in Ireland.  Based in Dublin, Edmund Rice Development was established in 2009, to formalise the fundraising efforts of the developing world projects for the Christian Brothers globally and received its charitable status in 2009.  Funding raised by the charity is directed mainly to nine countries in Africa, where The Christian Brothers work on mission in development: Ghana, Kenya, Liberia, Sierra Leone, South Africa, Sudan, Tanzania, Zambia, and Zimbabwe. In Kenya, they support the Ruben Centre  Additional funds are also raised for similar work in South America (Argentina, Bolivia, Paraguay, Peru and Uruguay) and India.

List of Superiors General 
The following is a list of the Superiors General of the Congregation of Christian Brothers. In recent times, "Congregational Leader" has been the title used.
 Edmund Ignatius Rice (1820 – 1838)
 Michael Paul Riordan (1838 – 1862)
 James Aloysius Hoare (1862 – 1880)
 Richard Anthony Maxwell (1880 - 1900)
 Michael Titus Moylan (1900 - 1905)
 Calasanctius Whitty(1905 - 1920)
 Jerome Hennessy (1920 - 1930)
 Joseph Pius Noonan (1930 - 1950)
 Edward Ferdinand Clancy (1950 - 1966)
 Arthur Austin Loftus (1966 - 1972)
 Justin Linus Kelty (1972 – 1978)
 Gerald Gabriel McHugh (1978 – 1990)
 Jerome Colm Keating (1990 – 1997)
 Edmund Michael Garvey (1997 – 2002)
 Philip Pinto (2002 – 2014)
 Hugh O'Neill (2014 – 2019)
 Gabriel Cardillo (2019-present)

Irish nationalism

The Irish Christian Brothers were among the strongest supporters of Irish republicanism, the Irish language revival, the Gaelic Athletic Association, and Gaelic games. In most Christian Brothers' schools in Ireland, Gaelic football, hurling and handball were encouraged and there were even examples of boys being punished for playing "foreign games", like soccer. Many GAA clubs were founded by Christian Brothers, many developing from schools teams, with many GAA clubs using the playing fields of the brothers' schools. They also run and sponsor The Rice Cup which was set up in 1944, and named after the order's founder, for post-primary hurling. They also sponsor the Westcourt Cup and Rice Shield. Many of the first Irish language textbooks were produced by the Christian brothers for their schools. Conor Cruise O'Brien called them "the most indefatigable and explicit carriers" of the Catholic nation idea.

Sexual abuse of children

In the late 20th and early 21st century many cases were exposed of emotional, physical and sexual abuse of children in the Christian Brothers' care over a number of decades. Cases emerged in Ireland, Canada, the United States, Australia and the United Kingdom.

Australia
The Royal Commission into Institutional Responses to Child Sexual Abuse documented Christian Brothers activities in Australia and in particular in Ballarat. 22% of Christian Brothers across Australia have been alleged sexual predators since 1950, according to the royal commission. The commissioners concluded that the Christian Brothers "completely failed... to protect the most vulnerable children in their care" and that senior brothers–including Brother Paul Nangle, Ballarat's highest Brother in the 1970s–had deliberately misled police in more recent statements about their knowledge of abuse.

There were allegations that during the 1970s sexual abuses took place at the junior campus of St Patrick's College and St Alipius Primary School in Ballarat, Victoria. After investigation, Brothers Robert Best, Edward Dowlan and Stephen Francis Farrell were all convicted of sex crimes. Dowlan and Best were later transferred to the senior campus, and continued to offend. Four of the school's brothers and their chaplain, Gerald Ridsdale, were accused of sexually assaulting children — all but one, who died before charges could be laid, have been convicted.

In December 2014, a royal commission found that "Christian Brothers leaders knew of allegations of sexual abuse of children at four Western Australian orphanages and failed to manage the homes to prevent the systemic ill-treatment for decades." During the 2016 Royal Commission into Institutional Responses to Child Sexual Abuse in Ballarat, it was found that 853 children, average age 13, had been sexually abused by one or more Christian Brothers. Child abuse complaints had been made against 281 Christian Brothers, and the Congregation had paid A$37.3 million in compensation.

The Royal Commissions final report of Catholic Church authorities in Ballarat was released on 6th. December. The report found that 56 Christian Brothers had claims of sexual abuse made against them in Ballarat and that there “was a complete failure by the Christian Brothers to protect the most vulnerable children in their care”.

The response to complaints of sexual abuse was "grossly inadequate": most often Christian Brothers were moved to new locations after an allegation had been made.

The Report found: "Often, the Christian Brother in question was allowed to remain in the position he held where the allegations arose, with continuing access to children," and "On many occasions, the Brother was moved to a new location after a complaint or allegation was made about his conduct. In some cases, the reason given for the move was to conceal the true reason for it and to protect the reputation of the Christian Brothers and avoid scandal and embarrassment."

In February 2020, Rex Francis Elmer pleaded guilty to two charges of indecently assaulting boys at St Vincent's Boys' Orphanage in South Melbourne. He was removed from St Vincent's in 1976 after a welfare officer who inspected the orphanage complained that he had “interfered with” boys who lived at the home. He was appointed headmaster of a Melbourne Catholic boys school a few years after the religious order became aware of his abuse.

Ireland and the UK

England
In December 2012, the Christian Brothers school St Ambrose College, Altrincham, Greater Manchester, was implicated in a child sex abuse case. A former lay teacher was convicted of nineteen counts of sexual assault occurring between 1972 and 1991.

Ireland
The Congregation of the Christian Brothers published full-page advertisements in newspapers in Ireland in March 1998, apologizing to former pupils who had been ill-treated whilst in their care. This advertising campaign expressed "deep regret" on behalf of the Christian Brothers and listed telephone lines which former pupils could ring if they needed help. In 2003 the Congregation brought a case against the Commission to Inquire into Child Abuse seeking to prevent the Commission from naming brothers accused of child abuse. Justice Sean Ryan declared that individual alleged perpetrators of abuse would not be named unless they had already been convicted 

In May 2009 a report was issued by the Commission to Inquire into Child Abuse (CICA) on allegations of child abuse committed on thousands of children in residential care institutions run by various religious institutes for the Irish state. This report found that sexual abuse of boys in institutions run by the Brothers was common. In response, the Irish ecclesiastical province issued a pledge to pay 161 million euros toward a fund set up to compensate male and female victims of such abuse both in their institutions and in those run by other religious institutes. , the Christian Brothers in Ireland continued to seek out-of-court settlement for historical claims initiated by survivors of sexual assault by Brothers, committed in day schools managed by the order in Ireland. Towards Healing was set up by CORI to offer therapy to survivors of clerical abuse; it is a Catholic organisation about whose independence there has been controversy. The Christian brothers in Ireland used the services of the L&P group to set up an education trust.

In late November 2009, the organization announced it would supply a €161 million (£145 million sterling) package as part of reparations for child abuse in Ireland. This includes a donation of €30 million to a government trust and €4 million donated to provide counselling services. Playing fields owned by the organisation and valued at €127 million would be transferred to joint ownership of the government and the trust that runs former Christian Brothers schools.

In 2019 former Brother John Gibson was convicted and received a prison sentence for his role in abuse in Wexford CBS in the 1980s & 1990s. On 22 June 2020, he received an additional four years after pleading guilty to a number of assault and sexual assault charges.

Scotland
In 2016 Fr. John Farrell, retired priest of the Diocese of Motherwell, the last Head teacher at St Ninian's Falkland, Fife, was sentenced to five years' imprisonment. His colleague Paul Kelly, a retired teacher from Portsmouth, was given ten years; both were convicted of the physical and sexual abuse of boys between the years 1979 and 1983. More than 100 charges involving 35 boys were made. The school closed in 1983.

In 2021 The Scottish Child Abuse Inquiry issued a report on the St. Ninians residential school which had been run by the Christian Brothers between 1953 and 1983.  The report concluded that the school was a "a place of abuse and deprivation" particularly from 1969 until the school closed in 1983. The Christian Brothers were able to "pursue their abusive practices with impunity" and the evidence against them was "shocking and distressing." Children in care suffered sexual, physical and emotional abuse.[

Michael Madigan, a representative for the Christian Brothers, said the congregation acknowledged with ‘deepest regret’ that children had been abused.

Canada
A pattern of physical and sexual abuse of more than 300 Mount Cashel Orphanage residents in St. John's, Newfoundland perpetrated by staff members, specifically members of the Christian Brothers of Ireland in Canada (CBIC), was uncovered during the late 1980s and early 1990s.

Multiple criminal investigations, a provincial Royal Commission of Inquiry (the Hughes Inquiry) and an Archdiocese of St. John's inquiry (the Winter Commission) resulted in criminal convictions and millions of dollars in court-imposed financial settlements. Compensation was provided by the Government of Newfoundland for orphanage residents who were wards of the state and several properties owned by the CBIC in Newfoundland and Labrador and other provinces were seized and liquidated.

Throughout 1989-1993 nine Christian Brothers were charged and prosecuted for various criminal offences, including sex offences against the boys of Mount Cashel orphanage.

Both the St. John's Archdiocese through the Canadian Conference of Catholic Bishops as well as the Congregation of Christian Brothers have since enacted policies aimed at the prevention of child sexual abuse.

In Ontario in January 1993 the Christian Brothers reached a financial settlement totaling $23 million with 700 former students who alleged abuse.

In February 2021, a British Columbia man alleged that he was sexually abused by one of the Christian Brothers, who confessed to the Royal Newfoundland Constabulary of molesting children at the Mount Cashel Orphanage in 1975.

United States 
Christian Brother Robert Brouillette, who had taught at St. Laurence High School,  was arrested in April 1998 in Joliet, Illinois, for indecent solicitation of a child. He was convicted in March 2000 of 10 charges related to child pornography, fined $2,000 and sentenced to four years probation. In 2002 a civil lawsuit was filed in Cook County, Illinois, against Brouillette for sexual assault against a 21-year-old man.

In 2013 the Edmund Rice Christian Brothers' North American Province, known as Irish Christian Brothers, paid US$16.5 million to 400 victims of child sexual abuse across the US, and agreed to enforce a zero-tolerance policy for brothers accused of abuse. This followed the Brothers' filing for bankruptcy in April 2011 following rising legal costs, and leading to a reorganization settlement between creditors and the order according to the US Chapter 11 bankruptcy code.

Publications

The Christian brothers composed and published a number of text books on several subjects, many in the Irish language, which were used by their schools.

Textbooks

 Irish History Reader, Christian Brothers, M. H. Gill & Son, Dublin, 1905.
 Graiméar na Gaeidhilge, Na Bráithre Críostaí, M. H. Gill, Dublin, 1901.
 Graiméar Gaeilge na mBráithre Críosta, M.H. Mac an Ghoill agus a Mhac Teo, Baile Átha Cliath, 1960.
 Matamaitic na hArdteistiméireachta, by Tomás Ó Catháin, Na Bráithre Críostaí, 1967.
 Leaving Certificate Chemistry, Christian Brothers Congregation, Folens, Dublin, 1970?.
 Leaving Certificate Physics [translated from the Irish], Christian Brothers Congregation, Folens, Dublin, 1973.
 New Irish Grammer, Christian Brothers, published by C. J. Fallon, Dublin, 1990.
 AIDS to Irish Composition by Christian Brothers (Jerome Fitzpatrick), 1902.
 Second Book of Modern Geography, The Christian Brothers, M. H. Gill & Son, Dublin, 1904.
 Cóir ṁúinte na Gaeḋilge, leis Na Bráiṫre Críostaí, M.H. mac an Goill, Baile  áṫa cliaṫ, 1910.
 First Steps in Irish: A classic, succinct, book for learning to read, write and speak the Irish language, by L.  Cinneide, The Christian Brothers.

Our Boys

Our Boys was a magazine for boys by Christian Brothers and the Educational Company of Ireland, published from September 1914 until the 1990s. It was based on British Boys Own adventure comics, with illustrated strips and adventure stories in English and Irish. It had an overt Catholic and Irish Nationalist outlook, featuring Irish Legends, GAA figures, the Missions and Catholic juvenile organisations. Illustrator Gerrit van Gelderen contributed to the magazine.

The Educational Record 
The Educational record was an annual collection of articles from Christian brother schools around the world published by them from their offices in Rome. Editors of the record include Liam Ó hAnluain and Richard Healy.

Notable Christian Brothers
 Gerald Griffin (1803–1840), Irish novelist, poet and playwright.
 John Philip Holland – inventor of the motor-powered submarine
 Paul Francis Keaney – Australian educator
 Joseph G. McKenna – American educator
 Paul Nunan – Australian educator
 Liam Ó hAnluain, (1910–1992), Irish language scholar contributed major contribution to a standard for Irish Grammer, he also served as provincial of the order.
 Blessed Edmund Ignatius Rice – founder of the Christian Brothers and the Presentation Brothers
 Thomas Munchin Keane, (1908-1989) teacher, and mathematician, wrote the first textbook for the new leaving certificate mathematics in Irish in the 1960s.
 Michael Paul Riordan – Irish early Christian Brother and second Superior General of the congregation
 Patrick Ambrose Treacy – Australian educator and leader of the first Australian community of Christian Brothers. 
 Godfrey Reggio - became a film director of Koyaanisqatsi after being a brother in the US.
 Laurence (Larry) Ennis (1933-2021), served as Antrim Gaelic football team manager from 1979 to 1981
 Jerome Fitzpatrick (1878-1910) - teacher and Irish Language enthusiast, and compiled and published many early aids to teaching the Irish language.
 Seamus Damien Brennan, teacher, principal, Hurling Manager, last teaching Christian brother in Ireland.

In popular culture 
 The play The Christian Brothers, first performed in 1975 and written by Ron Blair, is a one-man show depicting a Christian Brother teaching at a Catholic school in Australia in the 1950s, focusing much on the Brother's use of corporal punishment.
 In the 1985 film Lamb, Liam Neeson plays a Christian brother
 The Moving Hearts 1985 song All I Remember written by Mick Hanley, mentions Christian brothers
 The Saw Doctors 1991 single N17, refers to "when I left the Christian brother school"
 The television miniseries The Boys of St. Vincent is a fictional story based on real events of sexual abuse that took place at Mount Cashel Orphanage in St. John's, Newfoundland and Labrador, an orphanage run by the Christian Brothers.
 The 1993 film Alive!, based Alive: The Story of the Andes Survivors the 1974 book documenting the events of Uruguayan Air Force Flight 571, which contained rugby players from the Christian brother school Stella Maris College, Montevideo
 In 1994, the CBC released "The unforgiven: Mount Cashel, five years later,"  a documentary that profiled several of Mount Cashel's victims.
 The 2016 film Sing Street, is about a coming of age drama where a boy moves from a private fee-paying school to a Christian brother school "Synge Street"
 In 2022, an episode of the CBC television series Son of a Critch discussed the real-time impact that the initial revelations of the Mount Cashel Orphanage scandal had on Newfoundland society in the 1980s.

See also

 Catholic religious order
 Catholic spirituality
 Presentation Brothers
 Congregation of Christian Brothers in New Zealand
 Consecrated life
 List of Christian Brothers schools
 Margaret Humphreys, and The Child Migrant's Trust
 Roman Catholic sex abuse cases
 Abuse by priests in Roman Catholic orders

References

Further reading
 Davies, K. (1994) When Innocence Trembles: The Christian Brothers Orphanage Tragedy. (Angus & Robertson: Sydney)  
 Normoyle, M. C. A Tree is Planted: The Life and Times of Edmund Rice (Congregation of Christian Brothers: n.l., 1976)
 Humphreys, Margaret. Empty Cradles. Corgi, 1996.

External links
 Catholic Encyclopædia
 Christian Brothers on Edmund Rice
 Edmund Rice Christian Brothers North America
 Edmund Rice Education Beyond Borders
 Edmund Rice Foundation Australia

 
Institutes of Catholic religious brothers
Catholic teaching orders
Catholic orders and societies
Catholic religious institutes established in the 19th century
Catholic educational institutions
Catholic Church sexual abuse scandals in Australia